Brian Farrell (born April 16, 1972) is a retired American professional hockey player. He was drafted by the Pittsburgh Penguins in the fifth-round of the 1990 NHL Entry Draft.

Career
Farrell started his career at Harvard University in 1990, where he scored 11 points in 29 games. During that summer, the Pittsburgh Penguins made him their fifth-round selection (89th overall) in the 1990 NHL Entry Draft. Farrell would remain at Harvard University until his senior season in 1993–94, where he led the ECAC in goals scored (29 goals in 33 games), outscoring future NHL players Craig Conroy, Steve Martins (who was also Farrell's teammate), and Eric Perrin.

Farrell played professionally from 1994 until 1999 in the ECHL and AHL, before leaving the United States to play a single season with TEV Miesbach, a third-tier team in Germany's Oberliga. Farrell would later return to Germany to finish his career with the ERSC Amberg in Germany's fourth tier Regionalliga.

Farrell retired after the 2001-02 Regionalliga season.

Records
 Harvard University, Most Power Play Goals (single season) - 20, 1993

Personal
Farrell attended Avon Old Farms, a boarding school in Avon, Connecticut. During an alumni game in 2007, he was once "traded" to an opposing team (Team Diogenes), but responded by scoring a hat trick against his old team.

Since his retirement, Farrell has been active in coaching. He is a coach at the Renbrook School, a private school for kids aged 5 through 13 in West Hartford, Connecticut. Farrell also is an instructor at the Renbrook Summer Hockey Clinic

Awards and honors

References

External links

1972 births
American men's ice hockey left wingers
Chicago Wolves players
Cleveland Lumberjacks players
Fort Wayne Komets players
Harvard Crimson men's ice hockey players
Jacksonville Lizard Kings players
Living people
Mississippi Sea Wolves players
Sportspeople from Hartford, Connecticut
Pittsburgh Penguins draft picks
Springfield Falcons players
Tallahassee Tiger Sharks players
Toledo Storm players
Utah Grizzlies (AHL) players
Ice hockey players from Connecticut
Avon Old Farms alumni